The Spirit Pond runestones are three stones with alleged runic inscriptions, found at Spirit Pond in Phippsburg, Maine in 1971 by a Walter J. Elliott, Jr., a carpenter born in Bath, Maine. The stones, currently housed at the Maine State Museum, are widely dismissed as a hoax or a fraud.

Reception
Unlike the prehistoric monumental runestones raised in Scandinavia, the Maine stones are small handheld objects similar to the authentic Kingittorsuaq Runestone found in Greenland in 1824.

Of the three stones, one contains a total of 15 lines of 'text' on two sides. The map stone contains a map with some inscriptions.

The inscriptions contain several instances of the use of pentadic numerals in European digits placement. The first to study the stones scientifically was Harvard University professor Einar Haugen. In 1974, after transcribing, he found the individual runes used to be inconsistent with 11th century Old Norse, and that the text contains only "a few Norse words in a sea of gibberish". He also noted peculiarities relating the inscriptions directly to the Kensington Runestone inscription. Thus, he concluded that the inscriptions were most likely created after 1932.

Amateur researchers have been more sympathetic to a medieval origin of the stones. Suzanne Carlson of NEARA, a group of enthusiasts who believe there was a widespread Viking presence in North America, suggests a mid 14th century date for the inscriptions, although it is unclear how Carlson arrived at this date. Similarly, amateur rune-enthusiast Richard Nielsen claims a precise date of 1401.

See also
Maine penny, a Norwegian coin supposedly found in a prehistoric Maine archaeological site

References

Further reading 
 Wahlgren, Erik (1982). American Runes: From Kensington to Spirit Pond. University of Illinois Press.

External links 
 Transcription of Spirit Pond Number 3 (Figure 109) - Facsimile of "inscription stone"

Archaeological sites in Maine
Phippsburg, Maine
History of Maine
North American runestone hoaxes
Pseudoarchaeology
1971 archaeological discoveries
20th-century inscriptions
20th-century hoaxes